Alone is an unincorporated townsite in Metcalfe County, Kentucky at one time located along KY 1243.

History
Alone was named by J.C. Withers and had a post office established on November 30, 1880. D.J. Anderson was postmaster in 1887.

In 1892, The Beachville Lodge No. 619 of the Masons met at the post office every Saturday of each month.

From July 1, 1914, to July 1, 1917, Alone was supplied with a traveling library.

References

Populated places in Metcalfe County, Kentucky